The Casa-Voyageurs Railway Station is an ONCF ("Moroccan National Railway") station in the Belvedere neighborhood of Casablanca.

The station is served by suburban and long-distance trains. It is an important hub connecting several main lines of the Moroccan railway network.

History 
It had 8 platforms. 

It was expanded for Al Boraq service which began November 2018. Casa-Voyageurs became the southern terminus for the high speed train.

It is the largest railway hub in the country, serving direct trains within Morocco (Aïn Sebaâ, Fes, Khouribga, Marrakech, Rabat, Tangier) and Casablanca's Mohammed V International Airport.

Destinations
From Casa Voyageurs direct services are available to and from:
 Marrakech in Southern direction
 North via Rabat towards Tangier
 East via Rabat, Meknes, Fes, Taourirt to Oujda or Nador
 shuttles to Mohammed V International Airport
 local trains, including at

Local transport 
The station connects with Casablanca Tramway Line T1, the tram stop is in front of the station. It is served by M'dina Buses and by taxis.

References

External links  
 

Railway stations in Casablanca
Buildings and structures in Casablanca
Transport in Casablanca